Reginald George Warren Martin (June 25, 1887 – January 29, 1981) was a British lacrosse player who competed in the 1908 Summer Olympics. He was part of the British team which won the silver medal.

References

External links
Olympic profile

1887 births
1981 deaths
Lacrosse players at the 1908 Summer Olympics
Olympic lacrosse players of Great Britain
Olympic silver medallists for Great Britain
Medalists at the 1908 Summer Olympics
Olympic medalists in lacrosse
20th-century British people